Lincoln High School is a high school in Sioux Falls, South Dakota. Enrollment is currently at 1,966 students. Lincoln was included in the list of the top 1200 public schools in the US by Newsweek in their May 8, 2006 issue, ranking at 1,027.

Extracurricular activities

JrROTC (Marine Corps)
Lincoln High Schools JrROTC program is affiliated with the United States Marine Corps and is involved in flag ceremonies for many of the Patriot's sporting events. They're also involved in the community hosting many ceremonies for the American Legion and VFW organizations in Sioux Falls. The JrROTC program also has an award-winning drill team that competes all over the state of South Dakota and in the Midwest.

Marching band
The Lincoln High School Patriot Marching Band consists of 250 members, composed of woodwinds, brass, color guard, front ensemble, and drumline. The band performs in regional field competitions and street competitions. The band has appeared in the Rose Parade in Pasadena, California in 1992, 1998, 2005 and 2013. The band marched in the 1994, 2000, and 2008 Macy's Thanksgiving Day Parade. Bob Carlson, director of the program for 14 years, retired in 2013. The program is now led by his son Dan Carlson, assisted by Drew Balta as well as other staff and technicians. Lincoln earned a spot as a finalist at the Bands of America Super Regional in St. Louis, Missouri in 2015, performing their show "Gold Rush," again in 2017, performing their show "The Underground," and in 2021, performing their show "Queen's Gambit." The band placed 13th overall in finals in 2015 and 2017, and achieved an 11th place finish in 2021.

The 2022 season, which saw the band perform their program "Houdini: Unchained," proved to be a historic one for the Patriot Marching Band. On September 24, the band became the first ever band from South Dakota to win a BOA regional when they won 1st place overall at the BOA Iowa Regional in Waukee, IA. On October 15, the band qualified for finals at the St. Louis Super Regional marking the first time in program history that the band was a Super Regional Finalist in consecutive seasons. The band made further history by placing 4th overall in finals with a score of 87.950. Each marks the highest achieved placement and score by any South Dakota band at a BOA Super Regional Event.

DECA
The Sioux Falls Lincoln High School DECA program consists of students pursuing a strong future in business and marketing. Lincoln DECA has been the top performer at the South Dakota DECA State Career Development Conference. Lincoln has had the majority of student officers elected onto the State Action Team out of any School in South Dakota. The chapter is led by advisor Michael Jones. The 2013-2014 International President of DECA is a graduate of Lincoln High School, the first National Officer elected from South Dakota in the history of the 70-year-old organization.

Yearbook and newspaper
In addition to the yearbook (known as Heritage), Lincoln High School has a monthly student newspaper, The Statesman. The Statesman won the National Scholastic Press Association's Pacemaker Award in 2007. The Statesman was a finalist for the award in 2005, and was again nominated in September 2013 for the award. "The Statesman" has won a Superior Newspaper award every year from 2016-2022 along with a Silver Crown Award from Columbia Scholastic Press Association.

Student council
The LHS Student Council members are elected by the entire student body. The student council organizes activities such as dances and fundraisers.

Competitive speech activities
The speech and debate program has had a long history at Lincoln High School. It has continued to be successful since it was established with the school in 1965.
Lincoln's Debate and Oral Interp squads in recent years have been very successful. Annual Oral Interp teams average around 10 students.
The debate team won the Bruno E. Jacob Award at the 2007 NFL Nationals Speech and Debate Tournament in Wichita, Kansas.

Sports

Tennis: Freshman Girls, JV Girls, Varsity Girls, JV Boys, Varsity Boys
Cross Country: JV Girls, JV Boys, Varsity Girls, Varsity Boys
Football: Freshman Football, JV Football, Varsity Football
Soccer: JV Boys, Varsity Boys, JV Girls, Varsity Girls
Volleyball: Freshman Volleyball, Sophomore Volleyball, JV Volleyball, Varsity Volleyball
Cheerleading: Sophomore Football/Girls Basketball, Sophomore Boys Basketball/Wrestling, Varsity Football, Varsity Wrestling, Varsity *Girls' Basketball, Varsity Boys' Basketball
Dance: Patriettes
Basketball: Freshman Boys, Sophomore Boys, JV Boys, Varsity Boys, Freshman Girls, Sophomore Girls, JV Girls, Varsity Girls
Wrestling: JV, Varsity
Gymnastics
Baseball: Freshman/Sophomore, JV, Varsity
Softball: JV, Varsity
Swimming: SF Seals Swim Team, SF Snowfox Swim Team
Bowling
Golf: Freshman Boys, JV Boys, Varsity Boys, Freshman Girls, JV Girls, Varsity Girls
Track: Boys, Girls

Bus service
The school is serviced by Sioux Area Metro route 21, which is open to all fare-paying passengers Monday to Friday during the school year.

References

External links
Sioux Falls School District – Lincoln High School
Sioux Falls-Lincoln Improvement Plan
Marching Patriots Home
Lincoln Statesman
Lincoln Booster Club
SDHSAA school info

Public high schools in South Dakota
Education in Sioux Falls, South Dakota
Buildings and structures in Sioux Falls, South Dakota
Schools in Minnehaha County, South Dakota